Touka Neyestani (born 1960) is an Iranian political cartoonist who lives in Toronto, Ontario, Canada.  He is the brother of Mana Neyestani, who is also a cartoonist.

Life and career
Touka Neyestani was born in Tehran into a literary family. His father Manouchehr Neyestani (1936 - 1981) was a well-known Iranian poet and his brother Mana Neyestani also became a cartoonist and political satirist.  
Touka Neyestani is a well-known and popular cartoonist in Iran in his own right. He collaborates with more than 40 Iranian newspapers, and also produces cartoons for Nebel Spalter, a weekly publication printed in Switzerland. He has participated in several international cartoon exhibitions held in Japan, Belgium, Turkey, Iran, and Italy.

Political satirists, living in Iran, face a  number of threats. Work for cartoonists in daily newspapers has largely dried up. A website known as Persian Cartoons (Persiancartoons.com), designed to provide a mechanism for political satire to be dessiminated, was shut down in 2005, and many cartoonists have been forced to flee the country to escape the Secret Police. As a result, Neyestani has gravitated towards social media as the primary outlet for his cartoons, simply because it gives him greater control over who can read and comment on his posts. Facebook is also less likely to be hacked by the Islamic regime's cyber-security team. The Internet and social media have played an important part of the evolution of political satire in Iran.

Awards
He is the winner of many prizes, some from International cartoon exhibitions, including:
The Fifth Yomiuri Shimbun Cartoon Contest - Excellence Prize - 1984
11th Simavi International Cartoon Competition - Honorable Mention - 1993
First International Cartoon Competition, "Iran": "Man and Nature" - Honorable Mention - 1997
Sbadiglio Umoristico - Honorable Mention - 1998

References

External links
 Human Rights Organisation, Collection of Cartoons by Touka Neyestani

1960 births
Iranian caricaturists
Iranian cartoonists
People from Shahrud, Iran
Living people
Iran University of Science and Technology alumni